ROCS Pan Chao (班超, PFG2-1108) is the sixth of eight Taiwanese-built s of the Republic of China Navy, based on the United States .

Construction and career 
Laid down in July 1995 and launched in May 1996, Pan Chao was commissioned in December 1997. All of these Taiwanese frigates have the length of the later Oliver Hazard Perry-class frigates, but have a different weapon and electronics fit.

Like her sister ships, Pan Chao was built under license by China SB Corp. at Kaohsiung City, Taiwan, ROC.

, Pan Chao is homeported at Tso-Ying naval base.

Gallery

See also

References

Cheng Kung-class frigates
Ships built in the Republic of China
1997 ships
Frigates of the Republic of China